Boys' Latin School of Maryland is an all-boys, university-preparatory school located in Baltimore, Maryland. Founded in 1844, it is the oldest independent, nonsectarian secondary school in the state of Maryland. The school is divided into Lower, Middle and Upper Schools. There are approximately 640 students in kindergarten through twelfth grades.

History

Boys' Latin was founded in 1844 by Evert Marsh Topping, a former classics professor from Princeton University. The school was located in a downtown housing project (on Brevard Street) until the late 1950s, when its site was selected as part of a city-sponsored urban renewal project. The school relocated to its present  campus spanning Lake Avenue, on the border between Baltimore City and Baltimore County, in Roland Park, Baltimore, in the 1960s. On February 11, 2020, plans were announced to add a boarding school, in conjunction with the acquisition of an additional  parcel for student housing, beginning in 2021. After renovations to existing structures on the newly acquired property, 40 boys will be accommodated as residents, particularly international students.

Academics
The faculty has an average of 13 years of teaching experience and 60% hold an advanced degree. With a student to faculty ratio of 8:1, class sizes are small and offer many opportunities for individual interaction with the teacher and for student-centered activities. In addition to the care and instruction of classroom teachers, students in the Middle and Upper Schools are assigned to faculty advisers who monitor their academic and social development. Skills are woven throughout the curriculum. Educational Support Services (ESS) provides learning and teaching support in all divisions.

The Lower School begins with Kindergarten classes where students are first exposed to the Wilson Foundation system of language education. In addition to classes with their homeroom teacher in reading, the language arts, social sciences, and math, students have classes with specialized teachers for the beginning of their education in music, art, Spanish, music, science, technology, and physical education.

The Middle School offers traditional classes such as algebra, life sciences, and English, but there are also classes in life-skills such as decision making, desktop publishing, research, and independent reading. Students begin a formal, daily study of foreign language in the seventh grade with Latin and Spanish. In the eighth grade, students may elect to continue with the study of Latin or Spanish, or students may choose to study French. The eighth grade also presents an opportunity for students to develop public speaking skills: a formally prepared speech is part of their curriculum.

As a college preparatory school, the Upper School has a graduation requirement of several credits in English, math, history, science, and foreign languages to ensure that students are thoroughly prepared for the independent study required in college.  Additionally, students are required to take courses in physical education and health education, and the fine arts. There are also a wide variety of electives, and Advanced Placement (AP) courses are offered in thirteen subjects including calculus, statistics, physics, chemistry, biology, U.S. history, and English literature. The Williams Scholars Program provides incentives for academic achievement, including a stipend for summer educational programs.

The Upper School offers opportunities in the fine and performing arts, including studio art, painting, music & music composition, digital media, and drama & cinema classes. Private instrumental music lessons are available K-12, and musical productions & art showcases throughout the year display students' achievements. The Upper School presents drama productions in the winter and spring, and each year a senior is chosen to direct the spring production. After working through a multi-draft writing process and attending several coaching sessions on presenting skills, all seniors are required to deliver a senior speech to the entire upper school. There is a wealth of club and co-curricular activities, ranging from chess clubs and mock trial teams to digital photography and student newspaper publications available to all students. Boys' Latin is the first independent private school in the nation to incorporate a club dedicated to the One Love Foundation. The One Love club is the most popular club in the Upper School, and the club sponsors an annual, K-12 One Laker | One Love Day. Boys' Latin is recognized as a HERO Certified School by the One Love Foundation.

Athletics
Boys' Latin's sports teams are known as the Lakers. Boys' Latin is known for its lacrosse program; the Lakers play in the Maryland Interscholastic Athletic Association "A" Conference, one of the most competitive high school lacrosse leagues in the nation. They have currently 27 Division 1 players. In 2006, the Lakers completed an undefeated 21-0 championship season and were named the #1 high school lacrosse team in the United States, an honor the school also accomplished in 1985, 1988, 1997, and 2014.

Notable alumni

 Hanson W. Baldwin, military editor for The New York Times and Pulitzer Prize winner
 Alfred H. Barr, Jr., former director of the Museum of Modern Art in New York City.
 Justin Boston, professional racer driver
 John Glatzel, lacrosse player
 Calvin Goddard, ballistics expert, forensic scientist, army officer.
 Joseph Iglehart (1910), investment banker, baseball executive
 Brian Kowitz, former professional baseball player for the Atlanta Braves
 Edmund C. Lynch, co-founder of Merrill Lynch
 Keiffer J. Mitchell, Jr., politician
 Eric Papenfuse, mayor of Harrisburg
 Francis Hopkinson Smith, author, artist, engineer, descendant of Francis Hopkinson

References

External links
School website

Private schools in Baltimore
Middle States Commission on Secondary Schools
Boys' schools in Maryland
Educational institutions established in 1844
Preparatory schools in Maryland
Private K-12 schools in Maryland
1844 establishments in Maryland